EBICAB is a trademark registered by Bombardier (later Alstom) for the equipment on board a train used as a part of an Automatic Train Control system. EBICAB was originally derived from Ericsson's SLR system in Sweden. Most trains in Sweden and Norway use a similar on-board system, Ansaldo L10000 (more known as ATC-2) from Bombardier's competitor Ansaldo STS (now Hitachi Rail STS). ATC-2 was also developed in Sweden. 

These on-board systems use pairs of balises mounted on the sleepers. The pairs of balises distinguish signals in one direction from the other direction with semicontinuous speed supervision, using a wayside to train punctual transmission using wayside transponders.

Versions 
EBICAB comes in two versions, EBICAB 700 in Sweden, Norway, Portugal and Bulgaria and EBICAB 900 installed in the spanish Mediterranean Corridor (vmax= 220 km/h), and in Finland under the name ATP-VR/RHK. In Portugal it is known as Convel (the contraction of Controlo de Velocidade, meaning Speed Control).

The EBICAB 900 system uses wayside transponders (also called balises) with signal encoders or series communications with electronic lookup table, and on-board equipment on the train. The transmission of data occurs between the passive wayside transponders (between 2 and 4 per signal) and the antenna installed under the train, which powers the transponders when it passes over the transponder. The coupling between the transponder and the on-board antenna is inductive.

In comparison with ASFA, a system which transmits only a maximum amount of data per frequency, EBICAB uses electronic lookup table, the amount of data transmitted is much larger. 

Adif/Renfe, in Spain, sometimes use the term ATP to refer to EBICAB 900, which is the first system on its network to provide Automatic Train Protection. The Manila MRT Line 3 in the Philippines also uses the ATP term to refer to EBICAB 900.

Main Characteristics 

 Transponders operating in the ISM band at 27 MHz amplitude modulated for the clock pulses and impulse frequency of 50 kHz.
 Transmission of data to trains at 4,5 MHz at 50 kbit/s with 32 bit packets encoding 12 bits of information (EBICAB 700) or 255 bit packets encoding 180 bits of information (EBICAB 900), including the necessary synchronisation bits.
 The signals are linked (concatenated), but the signs, for example, for warnings and speed, are not necessarily linked (concatenated); it is acceptable to have 50% of the transponders linked to be safe against failures.
 The driver may input characteristics such as train identification, length, speed type, maximum speed, braking characteristics, and train pressure.
 The driver receives visual indications such as speed limit, target speed, overspeed, ASFA Alarm, braking reset, Permission to Pass, alarm signals, braking warning, red or alphanumeric indications.

Supervision 

 Line velocity, as a function of line capacity and the vehicle's performance capabilities in situations of overspeed or the imposition of lower velocity for some types of trains. 
 Multiple objectives, including signaling information without wayside signals.
 The system can enforce permanent, temporary and emergency speed restrictions by using unlinked (concatenated) transponders. 
 Stop Point.
 Dynamic braking profile.
 Status of the level crossing and landslide detectors.
 Maneuvers.
 Protection against wheel wear.
 Slip/Slide compensation.
 Authorization to pass a signal at Stop.

Warnings 

 Acoustic warning at excess of 5 km/h, service braking at excess of 10 km/h and emergency brake application at excess of 15 km/h
 The operator may release service braking when the speed is below one of the speed limits (Normally below the speed limit + 10 km/h in Portugal).

EBICAB 700 

The most important difference with EBICAB 900, is that EBICAB 700 can only transmit packets with 12 useful bits for a total of 32bits and allows up to 5 transponders per signal.

See also 
 Advanced Civil Speed Enforcement System
 Automatic Train Protection
 European Train Control System

References 

 Elementos Técnicos para la Gestión de Frecuencias en Espacios Complejos: Entornos Ferroviarios, 2002
 European Commission Decision 2006/860/EC of 7 November 2006 concerning a technical specification for interoperability relating to the control-command and signalling subsystem of the trans-European high speed rail system and modifying Annex A to Decision 2006/679/EC concerning the technical specification for interoperability relating to the control-command and signalling subsystem of the trans-European conventional rail system (repealed on 25.01.2012)
 252-045 en Tranvia.org, hilo ATP, en el Corredor Mediterráneo

This article incorporates information from a Ferropedia article, published in Castilian under a Creative Commons Compartir-Igual 3.0 license.

Rail infrastructure in Bulgaria
Railway signalling in Finland
Railway signaling in Norway
Railway signalling in Spain
Railway signalling in Sweden
Rail infrastructure in Portugal
Train protection systems